Cheryl Benard (born in 1953) is an academic scholar, writer, political scientist and novelist. She is the wife of Zalmay Khalilzad, former U.S. Ambassador to the United Nations, Afghanistan and Iraq. She and Khalilzad have two sons, Alexander Benard and Maximilian Benard.

Career
Benard worked as an actress in German films as a child. She later took a BA from the American University of Beirut and went on to earn a Ph.D. from the University of Vienna. She taught Political Science at the University of Vienna. Later, she served as research director of the Boltzmann Institute of Politics, a European think tank.

Presently, Benard is president of Alliance for the Restoration of Cultural Heritage (ARCH) International, a DC-based non-profit research and advocacy organisation dedicated to the support of cultural activism, specifically in post-conflict situations.

Writings
Benard is a novelist and a widely published author on topics including popular sociology, refugees, women in nation-building, youth radicalisation in the European Diaspora, and humanitarian aid. Her books have been translated into many other languages and some were bestsellers in Europe.

She is a feminist writer. She and Edit Schlaffer contributed the piece "Benevolent despotism versus the contemporary feminist movement" to the 1984 anthology Sisterhood Is Global: The International Women's Movement Anthology, edited by Robin Morgan.
Benard's most recent book, Eurojihad – Patterns of Islamist Radicalization and Terrorism in Europe, with Angel Rabasa, was published by Cambridge University Press in November 2014.

Controversy
Benard's Austrian bank account was frozen in February 2014. This happened as part of an investigation into allegations of money laundering by Benard's husband, former U.S. official Zalmay Khalizad. Benard and Khalilzad were subsequently cleared by the Austrian court system and US authorities and the freezing of her accounts was found to have been illegal. Prior to the announcement of the court decision, information about the investigation was leaked to the press, allegedly the result of court documents having been disposed of unshredded in the general trash and found by scavenging bloggers.

Books
The Government of God: Iran's Islamic Republic (1984) (with Zalmay Khalilzad) 
Wie aus Mädchen tolle Frauen werden. Selbstbewußtsein jenseits aller Klischees (2000) 
Moghul Buffet (2000) 
Turning on the Girls (2001) 
L'Inconnue de Peshawar (2002) 
Einsame Cowboys. Jungen in der Pubertät (2002)  (translation: Lonely Cowboys:  boys in puberty)
Veiled Courage: Inside the Afghan Women's Resistance (2002) 
Supermacht Mann:  oder das Ende der Vernunft (2004)  (translation: Superpower Man:  or, the end of reason.  This book is critical of U.S. military interventions.)
Civil Democratic Islam: Partners, Resources, and Strategies (2004)

References

1953 births
Living people
American women novelists
RAND Corporation people
Writers from New Orleans
University of Vienna alumni
American University of Beirut alumni
Academic staff of the University of Vienna
20th-century American novelists
20th-century American women writers
21st-century American novelists
21st-century American women writers
Novelists from Louisiana
American women academics